One Small Voice Foundation is a non-profit foundation which finances research into the medical disorders of optic nerve hypoplasia and hydrocephalus. It was founded by Deborah and Kevin Katzbeck after the birth of their hydrocephalic child in 2000.

References

External links
 

Medical and health foundations in the United States
Non-profit organizations based in Illinois